The 2021–22 Dartmouth Big Green men's basketball team represented Dartmouth College in the 2021–22 NCAA Division I men's basketball season. The Big Green, led by fifth-year head coach David McLaughlin, play their home games at Leede Arena in Hanover, New Hampshire as members of the Ivy League.

Previous season
Due to the COVID-19 pandemic, the Ivy League chose not to conduct a season in 2020–21.

Roster

Schedule and results

|-
!colspan=12 style=| Regular season

Source

References

Dartmouth Big Green men's basketball seasons
Dartmouth Big Green
Dartmouth Big Green men's basketball
Dartmouth Big Green men's basketball